Lucknow is a hamlet in Angus, Scotland. It lies on the A930 road between Monifieth and Barry.

References

Villages in Angus, Scotland